Arne Helge Carlson (born September 24, 1934) is an American politician who served as the 37th Governor of Minnesota. A Republican, Carlson's viewpoints are considered to be moderate. He first won election to the governors office in 1990. Carlson served as the governor from 1991 until 1999, winning reelection in 1994 Minnesota gubernatorial election.

Born into poverty in New York City, he attended the Choate Rosemary Hall preparatory school on a scholarship. After graduating from Williams College, he went to graduate school at the University of Minnesota. In his first race for elected office, Carlson ran for a seat on the Minneapolis City Council in 1965 as a Republican. Winning the election, he served until 1967. With the Republicans in the majority, Carlson also served as city council majority leader. He ran for Mayor of Minneapolis in 1967 against incumbent Democratic mayor Arthur Naftalin. Carlson lost the close election.

He went on to serve in the Minnesota House of Representatives from 1971 until 1979. Carlson then was the Minnesota State Auditor from 1979 until 1991. He launched a bid for the Republican nomination for governor of Minnesota in 1990. He lost the primary election to businessman Jon Grunseth. However, Grunseth became embroiled in a scandal weeks before the election causing Carlson to take his place on the ballot. He defeated incumbent governor Rudy Perpich. In 1994, he easily won reelection to a second term. Since his return to private life in 1999, he has been an active supporter of Democratic candidates but remains a Republican.

Early years, education and family
Born in New York City, Carlson is the son of Swedish immigrants from Gothenburg and Visby. Carlson attended New York City public schools P.S. 36 and DeWitt Clinton High School in the Bronx before gaining a scholarship to attend The Choate School (now Choate Rosemary Hall) in Wallingford, Connecticut. He earned a Bachelor of Arts degree in history from Williams College in 1957 before taking graduate courses at the University of Minnesota.

Career

Early career
Carlson served one term on the Minneapolis City Council from 1965 to 1967, and was the Republican candidate for mayor in 1967, losing to Democratic-Farmer-Labor incumbent Arthur Naftalin. He was a member of the Minnesota House of Representatives from January 1971 to January 4, 1979. In 1978, he ran for and was elected state auditor. He was reelected in 1982 and 1986, serving in that position from January 4, 1979, to January 7, 1991. As State Auditor, Carlson worked to create uniform accounting for cities, counties, townships, and special districts, making Minnesota a leader in uniform accounting. He also overhauled the State's multi-billion dollar pension investment portfolio to allow private sector management, which significantly improved the rate of return.

Minnesota Governor
Carlson was elected the 37th governor of Minnesota in the November 1990 general election, and served from January 7, 1991, to January 4, 1999. He won as a member of the Independent-Republican Party. In September 1995, the party changed its name to, simply, the "Republican Party."

A scandal arose in the 1990 election after the initial Republican nominee, businessman Jon Grunseth, beat Carlson in the primary. On October 15, it was revealed that, in 1981, Grunseth had invited three then-teenaged friends of his stepdaughter, as well as his stepdaughter herself, to go skinny-dipping in the pool at his home.

A bipartisan group, Minnesotans for the ''WRITE'' Choice, launched a statewide write-in media campaign six weeks before the general election, when the allegations of impropriety first surfaced. The campaign group focused media attention on Carlson's candidacy and Grunseth's problems.

Carlson had come in second in the primary to the more conservative Grunseth, and thus became the Republican nominee when Grunseth dropped out. Five days before the election, the state Supreme Court ruled that Carlson was eligible to appear on the ballot.

Generally considered a moderate, Carlson presented himself as a less polarizing leader than the incumbent governor, Rudy Perpich. He won the general election by 3 percentage points.

During his administration, Carlson worked to solve an inherited $2 billion state budget deficit. By the end of his term, the state had surpluses of $2.3 billion in FY1997 and $1.9 billion in FY1998. His administration restored the AAA bond rating from all three Wall Street major bond houses and was the first such state to receive the upgrade in 25 years.

Carlson increased funding for elementary and secondary education by nine percent, created a top level Children's Cabinet to develop a single integrated agenda and budget for all state children's programs and initiatives, laid the groundwork for the first light rail in Minneapolis with state and federal funding of $160 million and was successful in getting school choice funded which was hailed by the "Wall Street Journal" as a model for the rest of the country.

In 1993, Carlson served as Chairman of the Midwestern Governors Association. That same year he signed into law the Minnesota Human Rights Act, which banned LGBT discrimination in housing, employment, and education.

In 1994, the delegates to the Minnesota Republican Party State Convention viewed Carlson as too liberal, and endorsed instead Allen Quist and Doug McFarland. Carlson and running mate Joanne Benson nevertheless won the September state primary, and won the November general election by a large margin, 63% to 34%, over Democratic candidate John Marty.

As governor, Carlson was known as a fan of the University of Minnesota and its sports teams; his official portrait in the Minnesota State Capitol shows him wearing a letter jacket from the school. Carlson also worked closely with the President of the University of Minnesota, Mark Yudof, in improving the University's physical plant and in 1998, proposed and secured passage of an historic capital improvement package for all higher education with $206 million earmarked for the University of Minnesota. That led to projects ranging from building a molecular and cellular Biology Center to major renovations and upgrades to Walter Library.

Retirement
Carlson has remained politically active in retirement. Since 2011, he has written an independent blog. In a speech at the Minnesota State Capitol on October 23, 2008, he endorsed Democratic presidential candidate Barack Obama. In 2010, he announced that he would embark on a "Paul Revere" tour of Minnesota to bring attention to fiscal problems facing the state. In 2010, he again broke with his party to endorse Independence Party candidate Tom Horner in Minnesota's gubernatorial race and Tim Walz for Congress. In a narrow vote by the state Republican central committee, Carlson and 17 others were banned for two years from participating in party events, described by Politico as a "stunning purge."

Following the July 1, 2011, shutdown of the state government after Governor Mark Dayton and state legislative leaders could not agree on a budget, Carlson collaborated with Walter Mondale and several other prominent political and business leaders to propose a nonpartisan budget commission.

Carlson and Mondale also teamed to oppose a voter identification amendment to the state constitution in the 2012 election. The amendment was defeated.

Carlson is a member of the ReFormers Caucus of Issue One. In a June 2016 interview with City Pages, Carlson endorsed Democratic presidential candidate Hillary Clinton. In 2018, he also endorsed Dean Phillips, the DFL candidate for Minnesota's 3rd congressional district over GOP incumbent Erik Paulsen.

Personal life 
Carlson was married to Barbara Carlson (née Duffy) from 1965 to 1977. After their divorce she became known in her own right as a Minneapolis City Councilwoman and a talk show personality. Together, they had a son, Tucker (no relation to the media personality), and two daughters, Kristin (deceased) and Anne, who has two children, Drew and Allie Davis. Carlson's second wife was Joanne Chabot. They had no children. After their divorce, he married Susan Shepard, with whom he has a daughter, Jessica. Susan served as First Lady of Minnesota from 1991 to 1999.

Electoral history 
 1994 race for Governor
 Arne Carlson (I-R) (inc.), 63%
 John Marty (DFL), 34%
 1990 race for Governor
 Arne Carlson (I-R), 50%
 Rudy Perpich (DFL) (inc.), 47%
 1986 race for State Auditor
 Arne Carlson (I-R) (inc.)
 John Dooley (DFL)
 1982 race for State Auditor
 Arne Carlson (I-R) (inc.), 55%
 Paul Wellstone (DFL), 45%
 1978 race for State Auditor
 Arne Carlson (I-R), 52%
 Robert W. Mattson Jr. (DFL) (inc.), 47%

References

External links

Minnesota Historical Society

 Governor Arne Carlson Blog

|-

|-

|-

|-

|-

1934 births
American people of Swedish descent
American Protestants
Choate Rosemary Hall alumni
Republican Party governors of Minnesota
Living people
Republican Party members of the Minnesota House of Representatives
Minneapolis City Council members
Politicians from Minneapolis
Politicians from New York City
State Auditors of Minnesota
Williams College alumni